Toledo Balonmano was a handball club based in Toledo, Castile-La Mancha. Toledo Balonmano was founded in 2001 and played in División de Plata until January 2012 when was disbanded.

Season by season

Current squad 2010–11

Statistics 2010/11

Stadium information
Name: - Pabellón Municipal "Javier Lozano Cid" – inaugural year (1982)
City: - Toledo
Capacity: - 2.500 people
Address: - Carretera de Mocejón, s/n.

References

External links
Toledo BM Official Website
 Documentacion para entrenadores de Balonmano
 Revista digital de la Liga Asobal

Sports teams in Castilla–La Mancha
Spanish handball clubs
Handball clubs established in 2001
Handball clubs disestablished in 2012
2001 establishments in Spain
2012 disestablishments in Spain
Sport in Toledo, Spain